Moncef Mcharek is a Tunisian football manager. He is the current manager of Saudi club Al-Taraji.

References

Year of birth missing (living people)
Living people
Tunisian football managers
Al-Fayha FC managers
ES Zarzis managers
Tunisian expatriate football managers
Expatriate football managers in Saudi Arabia
Tunisian expatriate sportspeople in Saudi Arabia
Tunisian Ligue Professionnelle 1 managers
Saudi First Division League managers